Joe Sacco (born October 2, 1960) is a Maltese-American cartoonist and journalist. He is best known for his comics journalism, in particular in the books Palestine (1996) and Footnotes in Gaza (2009), on Israeli–Palestinian relations; and Safe Area Goražde (2000) and The Fixer (2003) on the Bosnian War. In 2020, Sacco released , published by Henry Holt and Company.

Biography
Sacco was born in Malta on October 2, 1960. His father Leonard was an engineer and his mother Carmen was a teacher. At the age of one, he moved with his family to Melbourne, Australia, where he spent his childhood until 1972, when they moved to Los Angeles. He began his journalism career working on the Sunset High School newspaper in Beaverton, Oregon. While journalism was his primary focus, this was also the period of time in which he developed his penchant for humor and satire. He graduated from Sunset High in 1978.

Sacco earned his BA in journalism from the University of Oregon in 1981 in three years. He was greatly frustrated with the journalist work that he found at the time, later saying, "[I couldn't find] a job writing very hard-hitting, interesting pieces that would really make some sort of difference." After being briefly employed by the journal of the National Notary Association, a job which he found "exceedingly, exceedingly boring," and several factories, he returned to Malta, his journalist hopes forgotten. "...I sort of decided to forget it and just go the other route, which was basically take my hobby, which has been cartooning, and see if I could make a living out of that," he later told the BBC.

He began working for a local publisher writing guidebooks. Returning to his fondness for comics, he wrote a Maltese romance comic named Imħabba Vera ("True Love"), one of the first art-comics in the Maltese language. "Because Malta has no history of comics, comics weren't considered something for kids," he told The Village Voice. "In one case, for example, the girl got pregnant and she went to Holland for an abortion. Malta is a Catholic country where, at the time, not even divorce was allowed. It was unusual, but it's not like anyone raised a stink about it, because they had no way of judging whether this was appropriate material for comics or not."

Eventually returning to the United States, by 1985 Sacco had founded a satirical, alternative comics magazine called Portland Permanent Press in Portland, Oregon. When the magazine folded fifteen months later, he took a job at The Comics Journal as the staff news writer. This job provided the opportunity for him to create and edit another satire: the comics anthology Centrifugal Bumble-Puppy  (a name he took from an overcomplicated children's toy in Aldous Huxley's Brave New World), published by The Comics Journals parent company Fantagraphics Books.

But Sacco was more interested in traveling. In 1988, he left the U.S. again to travel across Europe, a trip which he chronicled in his autobiographical comic Yahoo (also published by Fantagraphics). The trip led him towards the ongoing Gulf War (his obsession with which he talks about in Yahoo #2), and in 1991 he found himself nearby to research the work he would eventually publish as Palestine, a documentary graphic novel, which gather testimonies of survivors of war and trauma.

The Gulf War segment of Yahoo drew Sacco into a study of Middle Eastern politics, and he traveled to Israel and the Palestinian territories to research his first long work. Palestine was a collection of short and long pieces, some depicting Sacco's travels and encounters with Palestinians (and several Israelis), and some dramatizing the stories he was told. It was serialized as a comic book from 1993 to 1995 and then published in several collections, the first of which won an American Book Award in 1996 and sold more than 30,000 copies in the UK.

Sacco next travelled to Sarajevo and Goražde near the end of the Bosnian War, and produced a series of reports in the same style as Palestine: the comics Safe Area Goražde, The Fixer, and the stories collected in War's End; the financing for which was aided by his winning of the Guggenheim Fellowship in April 2001. Safe Area Goražde won the Eisner Award for Best Original Graphic Novel in 2001.

He has also contributed short pieces of graphic reportage to a variety of magazines, on subjects ranging from war crimes to blues, and was a frequent illustrator of Harvey Pekar's American Splendor. In 2005 he wrote and drew two eight-page comics depicting events in Iraq published in The Guardian. He also contributed a 16-page piece in April 2007's issue of Harper's Magazine, entitled "Down! Up! You're in the Iraqi Army Now". In 2009, his Footnotes in Gaza was published, which investigates two forgotten massacres that took place in Khan Younis and Rafah in November 1956. In June 2012, a book on poverty in the United States, Days of Destruction, Days of Revolt, co-written with journalist Chris Hedges, was published.  His latest work is Paying The Land (2020) discussing climate change and the indigenous Dene community of Northwest Canada, who, he says, were subject to cultural genocide by means of compulsory residential schooling, treaties, and capitalism. 

Sacco currently lives in Portland, Oregon.

Awards
In addition to his 1996 American Book Award, and 2001 Guggenheim Fellowship, Sacco's Safe Area Goražde brought him a Time magazine "Best Comic of 2000" award, followed by 2001 Eisner Award for Best Original Graphic Novel, and 2001 Eagle Award for Best Original Graphic Novel, and 2001 Harvey Award nomination for Best Writer and Best Graphic Album of Original Work.

His Footnotes in Gaza was nominated for the 2009 Los Angeles Times Book Prize Graphic Novel award. Sacco was awarded the 2010 Ridenhour Book Prize for Footnotes in Gaza. He was award the 2012 Oregon Book Award for Footnotes in Gaza and 2014 Oregon Book Award Finalist for Journalism.

Bibliography

Comic books

Solo
1988–1992: Yahoo #1–6. Fantagraphics Books
1993–1995: Palestine #1–9. Fantagraphics Books
1994: Spotlight on the Genius that is Joe Sacco. Fantagraphics Books
1998: Stories From Bosnia #1: Soba. Drawn & Quarterly

Editor
1987–1988: Centrifugal Bumble-Puppy. Fantagraphics Books
1987: Honk!. Fantagraphics Books

Comics journalism stories 
 "The War Crimes Trials," Details (September 1998), pp. 260-265.
 "The Rude Blues," Details (April 2000), pp. 140-145.
 "Hebron: A Look Inside," Time (March 12, 2001), pp. 40-43.
 "The Underground War in Gaza," The New York Times Magazine (July 6, 2003).
 "Complacency Kills," The Guardian Weekend (Feb. 26, 2005), pp. 16–24.
 "Down! Up! You're in the Iraqi Army Now", Harper's Magazine (April 2007), 16 pp.

Books

Solo
1993: Palestine: A Nation Occupied. Fantagraphics Books.  (collects Palestine #1–5)
1996: Palestine: In the Gaza Strip. Fantagraphics Books.  (collects Palestine #4–9)
1997: War Junkie. Fantagraphics Books. .
2000: Safe Area Goražde: The War in Eastern Bosnia 1992–1995. Fantagraphics Books.  (expanded edition 2010)
2001: Palestine. Fantagraphics Books.  (collects Palestine #1–9) (expanded edition in 2007)
2003: The Fixer: A Story from Sarajevo. Drawn & Quarterly Books. 
2003: Notes from a Defeatist. Fantagraphics Books.  (collects Yahoo #1–6)
2005: War's End: Profiles from Bosnia 1995–96. Drawn & Quarterly. 
2006: But I Like It. Fantagraphics Books. 
2009: Footnotes in Gaza. Metropolitan Books, . Jonathan Cape, 
2012: Journalism. Metropolitan Books, 
2013: The Great War: July 1, 1916: The First Day of the Battle of the Somme. W. W. Norton & Company. 
2014: Bumf Vol. 1: I Buggered the Kaiser. Fantagraphics Books. 
2020: Paying the Land. Henry Holt and Co.

As illustrator
2002: From the Folks Who Brought You the Weekend: A Short, Illustrated History of Labor in the United States with Priscilla Murolo and A. B. Chitty.
2012: Days of Destruction, Days of Revolt with Chris Hedges. Nation Books,

See also
 New Journalism
 Alternative comics
 @earth
 Eye

References

Notes

Sources 
 ———. 2003. "The thin black line: Cartoonist Joe Sacco, who illustrated the Sarajevo war zone in 'The Fixer,' will be in town to discuss his craft." The Oregonian (November 14).
 Adams, James. 2003. “Conflict's cartoonist: It bothers Joe Sacco that people are suffering in Gaza or Gorazde, and he uses his singular comic-book style to make sure it bothers other people too." Toronto Globe and Mail (November 10).
 Arnold, Andrew. 2003. "Looks Like a Job for 'The Fixer': Joe Sacco's latest work of comix-journalism." Time.com (October 31).
 Baker, Bill. 2003. "Redirected Male: Fields of Gold." Sequential Tart (April).
 Baker, Bill. 2001. "War Tales: 5 Minutes with Joe Sacco on Safe Area Gorazde." WizardWorld.com (January 2).
 Baker, Bill. 2000. "Comics Journalism 101: 5 Minutes with Joe Sacco." WizardWorld.com (December 28): 
 Baker, Bill. 2000. "[Undeclared] Wartime: 5 Minutes with Joe Sacco on Palestine." WizardWorld.com (December 27): 
 Dodge, Chris. 2000. "Art behind the lines: How a comic book can reveal the truth of war." Utne Reader (May-June): 94-95
 Doughty, Dick. 1996. "Palestine with attitude". Journal of Palestine Studies
 Edwards, Gavin. 2000. "The art of war." Spin (June)
 Farah, Christopher. 2003. "Safe area America: Graphic novelist Joe Sacco goes back to Sarajevo with his powerful new book 'The Fixer' -- and talks about why the entire U.S. population should be tried for war crimes." Salon (December 5)
 Garfield, Bob. 2003. "Sacco's New War." WNYC / National Public Radio's On the Media (November 14). (Also: a transcript of the interview is here.)
 Gallivan, Joseph. 2003. "Serious ink: Cartoonist Joe Sacco doesn't shy from conflict; in fact, he wants to tell all about it." Portland Tribune (November 28).
 Garelick, Jon. 2001. "Orwell with India ink: Joe Sacco's war journalism," Boston Phoenix (February 23).
 Hajdu, David. 2003. "Comics for Grown-Ups," The New York Review of Books 50 (13; August 14).
 Harvey, R. C. 2001. "Opus 60: Tittles and Jots: A Quick Look at What's Still on the Stands and Some Cartoonist Reportage." Rants & Raves (May 23).
 Hedges, Chris. 1997. "A cartoonist sketches outline of Bosnia's pain". The New York Times (June 1)
 Heer, Jeet. 2003. "More about the war: Joe Sacco's comics reveal things about conflicts that the news just can't." National Post (October 9)
 Hitchens, Christopher. 2000. "The Draftsman's Contract" [review of Safe Area Gorazde],  Los Angeles Times (June 11)
 Iannelli, E. J. 2000. "Battle lines: Joe Sacco's illustrated journalism puts a face on Bosnia." Resonance (26; Summer): 10-11
 Kurson, Ken. 1996? "The good word." Might magazine: (3)
 Lorberer, Eric. 2000. "Graphic novels: Safe Gorazde: The War in Eastern Bosnia 1992-1995 by Joe Sacco" [review]. Rain Taxi 5 (2; Summer): 16
 Lydon, Christopher. 2001. "Cartoon Journalist Joe Sacco [interview]. WBUR's The Connection (April 19)
 Mautner, Christopher. 2000. "'Safe Area Gorazde': Cartoonish art draws compelling story of war's horrors". The Patriot-News (May 21)
 McKenna, Kristine. 2004. "Brueghel in Bosnia: Kristine McKenna talks with graphic journalist Joe Sacco." LA Weekly (January 2–8).
 Murray, Charles Shaar. 2003. "The graphic truth about Palestinian existence," The Independent (February 4).
 Nevins, Mark. 2002. "Drawing From Life: An Interview with Joe Sacco." International Journal of Comic Art 4 (2; Fall): 1-52
 Phipps, Keith. 2000. "Joe Sacco, Safe Area Gorazde: The War In Eastern Bosnia." The A.V. Club.
 Reid, Calvin. 2003. "Joe Sacco, Comics Journalist." Publishers Weekly (November 24)
 Rhode, Michael. 2000. "Sequential Reportage" [letter]. The Comics Journal (221; March)
 Said, Edward. 2002. "Heroes and villains: As a child, Edward Said would marvel at the adventures in comic books. Joe Sacco's Palestine took him back to that time - and to the heart of the Middle East conflict." The Guardian (December 21).
 Spurgeon, Tom. 2000. "Drawing enemy lines: Safe Area Gorazde: The War in Eastern Bosnia, 1992-95". The Comics Journal (227; September): 5-6
 Stein, Joel. 2000. "Joe Sacco's Safe Area Gorazde is a comic-book look at a horrible war." Time (May 1): 72
 Thompson, David. 2003. "Eyewitness in Gaza: Joe Sacco's comic-book format provides an unlikely but compelling insight into the Palestinian experience in Palestine." The Observer (January 5).
 Totilo, Stephen. 2000. "Stuff we like: Safe Area Gorazde." Brill's Content (May)
 True, Everett. 2000. "No comic relief: It might be in cartoon form but Joe Sacco's account of life in wartorn Bosnia is not a laughing matter." London Times (June): 21
 Vaillant, John. 1998. "War 'toons. Joe Sacco: front-line correspondence, with pens and brushes." Men's Journal (November): 58

Further reading

External links
Comics by Sacco
 2006 report on military action in Iraq, The Guardian
 2005 report on military action in Iraq, The Guardian
 On Satire – a response to the Charlie Hebdo attacks (January 2015), The Guardian

Biographies

Fantagraphics Books: Joe Sacco
Joe Sacco Biography From Fantagraphics
Harpers magazine piece
An Evening With Joe Sacco in Los Angeles

Interviews
Joe Sacco on Footnotes in Gaza – Interview on the 7th Avenue Project radio show
Joe Sacco on Palestine – Interview by Al Jazeera English
Brueghel in Bosnia Interview in L.A. Weekly.
The Art Of War Interview in Mother Jones.
Joe Sacco, Man of the World Audio interview on mp3 from The Crown Commission.
Interview with Joe Sacco – interview on Weekend America
Interview with Joe Sacco on bdtheque.com for the release of Footnotes in Gaza.
Eyeglass in Gaza Interview in "The Guardian".
Joe Sacco in conversation with Hillary Chute – Interview in The Believer
Joe Sacco on C-SPAN's Book TV
 Joe Sacco: Presentation and interview from the 2002 UF Comics Conference — ImageTexT

American cartoonists
American comics artists
Alternative cartoonists
Maltese comics artists
Maltese cartoonists
Maltese emigrants to the United States
Maltese journalists
Writers from Portland, Oregon
University of Oregon alumni
Living people
1960 births
Sunset High School (Beaverton, Oregon) alumni
People from Kirkop
Maltese emigrants to Australia
American graphic novelists
American Splendor artists
American Book Award winners
Novelists from Oregon
20th-century Maltese artists
21st-century Maltese artists
English-language writers from Malta
Maltese-language writers from the United States